Manjeet Singh (born 1 November 1991) is an Indian first-class cricketer who plays for Railways.

References

manjeet singh katare

External links
 

1991 births
Living people
Indian cricketers
Railways cricketers
Rajasthan cricketers
People from Alwar